Richard R. Coffman is a United States Army lieutenant general who serves as the deputy commanding general for combat development of the United States Army Futures Command. He most recently served as Director of the Next Generation Combat Vehicle Cross Functional Team from August 2018 to August 2022. He previously served as deputy commanding general (maneuver) of the 1st Infantry Division from September 2017 to July 2018.

In May 2022, Coffman was nominated for promotion to lieutenant general and assignment as the deputy commanding general of United States Army Futures Command.

References

External links

Living people
United States Army generals
Year of birth missing (living people)